State governments in India are the governments ruling over 28 states and 8 union territories of India and the head of the Council of Ministers in a state is the Chief Minister. Power is divided between the Union government and state governments. While the Union government handles defence, external affairs etc., the state government deals with internal security  and other state issues. Income for the Union government is from customs duty, excise tax, income tax etc., while state government income comes from sales tax (VAT), stamp duty etc.; now these have been subsumed under the various components of the Goods and Services Tax

Each state has a legislative assembly. A state legislature that has one house - State Legislative Assembly (Vidhan Sabha) - is a unicameral legislature.

A state legislature that has two houses - the State Legislative assembly and State Legislative Council (Vidhan Parishad) - is a bicameral legislature. The Vidhan Sabha is the lower house and corresponds to the Lok Sabha while the Vidhan Parishad is the upper house and corresponds to the Rajya Sabha of the Parliament of India.

The Sarkaria Commission was set up to review the balance of power between states' and the Union governments. The Union government can dissolve a state government in favour of President's rule if necessary, subject to certain conditions, as ruled by the Supreme Court of India in S. R. Bommai v. Union of India. It is for 5 years only.

Legislative 

For every state, there is a legislature, which consists of a Governor and either one or two houses.

Legislative Council

6 out of 28 states have bicameral legislatures, namely Andhra Pradesh, Bihar, Karnataka, Maharashtra, Telangana, and Uttar Pradesh, with the remaining states having a unicameral one. Parliament may, by law, provide for the abolition of an existing Legislative Council or for the creation of one where it does not exist, if the proposal is supported by a resolution of the Legislative Assembly of the state concerned.

The Legislative Council of a state comprises not more than one-third of the total number of members in the legislative assembly of the state and in no case fewer than 40 members. About one-third of members of the Council are elected by members of the legislative assembly from amongst persons who are not its members, one-third by electorates consisting of members of municipalities, district boards and other local authorities in the state, one-twelfth by an electorate consisting of persons who have been, for at least three years, engaged in teaching in educational institutions within the state not lower in standard than secondary school and a further one-twelfth by registered graduates of more than three years' standing. Remaining members are nominated by the Governor from among those who have distinguished themselves in literature, science, art, cooperative movement and social service. Legislative Councils are not subject to dissolution but one-third of their members retire every second year.

Legislative councils by ruling parties

Legislative Assembly

The Legislative Assembly of a state consists of not more than 500 and not fewer than 60 members (Legislative Assembly of Sikkim has 32 members, while Puducherry has 33, Goa and Mizoram have 40 seats each vide Article 371F of the Constitution) chosen by direct election from territorial constituencies in the state. Demarcation of territorial constituencies is to be done in such a manner that the ratio between population of each constituency and number of seats allotted to it, as far as practicable, is the same throughout the state. The term of an assembly is five years unless it is dissolved earlier.

Legislative assemblies by ruling parties

Powers and Functions

State legislature has exclusive powers over subjects enumerated in the State List (List II of the Seventh Schedule) of the Constitution and concurrent powers over those enumerated in sub List III. Financial powers of legislature include authorization of all expenditure, taxation and borrowing by the state government. The Legislative Assembly alone has the power to originate money bills. The Legislative Council can only make recommendations in respect of changes it considers necessary within a period of fourteen days of the receipt of money bills from the Legislative Assembly, which can accept or reject these recommendations.

The Governor of a state may reserve any Bill for the consideration of the President. Bills relating to subjects like the compulsory acquisition of property, measures affecting powers and position of High Courts, and the imposition of taxes on storage, distribution, and sale of water or electricity in Inter-state River or river valley development projects should necessarily be so reserved. No Bills seeking to impose restrictions on inter-state trade can be introduced in a state legislature without the previous sanction of the President.

State legislatures, apart from exercising the usual power of financial control, use all normal parliamentary devices like questions, discussions, debates, adjournments, and no-confidence motions and resolutions to keep a watch over the day-to-day work of the executive. They also have their own committees on estimates and public accounts to ensure that grants sanctioned by the legislature are properly utilized.

There are, overall, 4,121 legislative assembly seats in states and Union territories of India. Andhra Pradesh abolished its Legislative Council in 1984, but set up a new Legislative Council following elections in 2007.

Executive 

The state executive consists of a Governor and the State Council of Ministers, with the Chief Minister as its head.

Governor 

The Governor of a state is appointed by the President of India for a term of five years and holds office during their pleasure. Only Indian citizens above 35 years of age are eligible for appointment to this office.

Executive power of the state is vested in the Governor. All Governors are obligated to discharge their constitutional functions such as the appointment of the Chief Minister of a state, sending a report to the President on the failure of the Constitutional machinery in a state or in respect of matters relating to assent to passing a bill in the state assembly.

Similarly, in respect of Arunachal Pradesh, its Governor has special responsibility under Article 371H of the Constitution with respect to law and order and in discharge of his functions in relation thereto. The Governor exercises his individual judgement as to the action to be taken after consulting the Council of Ministers. These are, however, temporary provisions. If the President of India, on receipt of a report from Governor or otherwise is satisfied that it is no longer necessary for the Governor to have special responsibilities with respect to law and order, he may so direct by an order.

Likewise, in the Sixth Schedule which applies to tribal areas of Assam, Meghalaya, Tripura and Mizoram as specified in para 20 of that Schedule, discretionary powers are given to the Governor in matters relating to sharing of royalties between the district councils and the state government. The Sixth Schedule vests additional discretionary powers in the Governors of Mizoram and Tripura in almost all their functions (except approving regulations for levy of taxes and money lending by non-tribal district councils) since December 1998. In Sikkim, the Governor has been given special responsibility for peace and social and economic advancement of different sections of population.

Council Of Ministers 
The Chief Minister is appointed by the Governor, who also appoints other ministers on the advice of the Chief Minister. The Council of Ministers is collectively responsible to the Legislative Assembly of the state.

The Council of Ministers with the Chief Minister as its head aids and advises the Governor in exercise of his functions except in so far as he is by or under the Constitution required to exercise his functions or any of them at his discretion. In respect of Nagaland, its Governor has special responsibility under Article 371 A of the Constitution with respect to law and order and even though it is necessary for him to consult Council of Ministers in matters relating to law and order, he can exercise his individual judgement as to the action to be taken.

Judiciary 
State High courts have jurisdiction over the whole state, but report to the Supreme Court of India, which may override the high court's judgments and rulings.

List of current state governments

See also 
 List of current Indian governors
 List of current Indian chief ministers
 List of current Indian chief justices
 Federalism in India
 Politics of India
 Elections in India
 List of Indian state legislative assembly elections

References